Ziriklytamak (Yerekletamaq) is a rural locality (a village) in Kosh-Yelginsky Selsoviet, Bizhbulyaksky District, Bashkortostan, Russia. The population was 64 as of 2010. There is 1 street.

Geography 
Ziriklytamak is located 44 km north of Bizhbulyak (the district's administrative centre) by road. Kosh-Yelga is the nearest rural locality.

References 

Rural localities in Bizhbulyaksky District